The West-Blazer House is a historic house at 8107 Peters Road, in rural Pulaski County, Arkansas northeast of Jacksonville.  It is a single story frame structure, with a weatherboard exterior and hip roof.  A porch adorned with Folk Victorian trim elements extends across its front and around the side.  Built in 1912, it is one of the only surviving period buildings of the community of Ebenezer, a thriving rural community that once had a church, school, and businesses.

The house was listed on the National Register of Historic Places in 2017.

See also
National Register of Historic Places listings in Pulaski County, Arkansas

References

Houses on the National Register of Historic Places in Arkansas
Houses completed in 1912
Houses in Pulaski County, Arkansas